The Hawaii State Department of Education (HIDOE) is a statewide public education system in the United States. The school district can be thought of as analogous to the school districts of other cities and communities in the United States, but in some manners can also be thought of as analogous to the state education agencies of other states. As the official state education agency, the Hawaii State Department of Education oversees all 283 public schools and charter schools and over 13,000 teachers in the State of Hawaii.  It serves approximately 185,000 students annually. The HIDOE is currently headed by Superintendent Keith Hayashi (since July 1, 2022). The department is headquartered in the Queen Liliuokalani Building in Honolulu CDP, City and County of Honolulu on the island of Oahu.

Public schools in Hawaii take their money from the state general fund and not from property taxes.

History
Kamehameha III established Hawaii's first public education system on October 15, 1840. This makes the Hawaii State Department of Education the oldest school system in the US west of the Mississippi River, and the only system established by a sovereign monarch. This date denotes when the constitution came into effect, codifying the new ministry of education. The regent of Kamehameha III, Queen Emma, had ordered the establishment of free public schools in all districts in 1834 and this was done by 1836.

Board of Education
The Board of Education members are appointed by the Governor of Hawaii and must be confirmed by the Hawaii State Senate. This is in contrast to most other school districts in the United States which are directly elected. Members are appointed for three-year terms for a maximum of three terms.

The school district has the following positions in its Board of Education.
Positions:
 Board First Vice Chairperson
 Board Second Vice Chairperson

At-large positions:
 Oahu-at-Large: 5 positions

District positions
 Central District (Oahu)
 Hawaii District
 Honolulu District (Oahu)
Kaimuki-McKinley-Roosevelt Complex Area
Farrington-Kaiser-Kalani Complex Area
 Kauai District
 Leeward District (Oahu) done
 Maui District
 Windward District (Oahu)

The Board also has a student member and a military liaison.

The Board of Education is empowered by the State Constitution (Article X, Section 3 ) to formulate statewide education policy. The Board also has the power to appoint the Superintendent of Education as the chief executive officer of the system. The Superintendent reports to and can be terminated by the Board.

The State Department of Education currently carries suggested benchmarks for each educational grade and subject which are available on its website.  However, a law creating a standard state public school curriculum, the first of its kind in Hawaii, did not pass during the 2006 legislative session.

Relevant debates

Probably the most current and controversial debate over Hawaii school reform has to do with the structure of the State Department of Education: specifically, whether it should remain centralized or be broken into smaller districts.  The main rationale usually given for the current centralized model is equity in distribution of resources:  all schools are theoretically funded from the same pool of money on an equitable basis.  (Most schools on the U.S. Mainland are organized into school districts funded from local property taxes; thus more affluent school districts theoretically receive more money and resources than less affluent areas.)  Supporters of decentralization see it as a means of moving decision-making closer to the classroom, and thus achieving better student performance.

The debate divides roughly along party lines, with Republicans generally supporting decentralization and the Democrats supporting the centralized status quo.  In 2002, Republican Governor Linda Lingle ran on a campaign to reorganize the Hawaii State Department of Education into smaller school districts that were localed modeled after a system found in Canada.  The Democrat-controlled Hawaii State Legislature, however, voted not to enact this plan in 2003 and 2004.

In October 2009, the Hawaii Department of Education agreed to a furlough program for Hawaii's public schools that reduced the number of instructional days by 17 days to a total of 163 days.  This is the smallest number of instructional days anywhere in the United States.

Structure
The state-wide system is divided into seven Districts; each District subdivided into Complex Areas; each Complex Area includes at least one Complex; and each Complex comprises high schools and the middle and elementary schools that feed into them. These are:

Honolulu District:  Farrington-Kaiser-Kalani and Kaimuki-McKinley-Roosevelt Complex Areas. 
Central District:  Aiea-Moanalua-Radford and Leilehua-Mililani-Waialua Complex Areas. 
Leeward District:  Campbell-Kapolei, Pearl City-Waipahu, and Nanakuli-Waianae Complex Areas.
Windward District:  Castle-Kahuku and Kailua-Kalaheo Complex Areas.
Hawaii District:  Hilo-Waiakea, Kau-Keaau-Pahoa, and Honokaa-Kealakehe-Kohala-Konawaena Complex Areas.
Maui District: Baldwin-Kekaulike-Maui and Hana-Lahainaluna-Lanai-Molokai Complex Areas.
Kauai District:  Kapaa-Kauai-Waimea Complex Area

Schools

Public high schools

Public middle schools

Public elementary schools

See also

 State education agency
 Hawaii State Student Council

References

External links

Hawaii State Department of Education

Native Hawaiian Education Council
Hawaii Official list of public school alumni sites in Hawaii

Hawaii
Hawaii
Education
Educational institutions established in 1840
1840 establishments in Hawaii